José Rafael Pocaterra (18 December 1889 – 18 April 1955) was a Venezuelan writer, journalist and politician.

Career 
He was imprisoned in 1907 to 1908 for his work on the opposition newspaper Caín, and again from 1919 to 1922 after participating in Luis Rafael Pimentel's attempt to overthrow the dictator Juan Vicente Gómez. Whilst in prison, where he was tortured, he wrote the history book Memorias de un venezolano de la decadencia (published in 1927) and the novel La casa de los Ábila (published 1946). Later he participated in Román Delgado Chalbaud's ill-fated 1929 Falke expedition aimed at over-throwing Juan Vicente Gómez. Under Eleazar López Contreras he was Minister of Communications (1939–1941), and then held a variety of ambassadorial posts (to the United Kingdom, the Soviet Union, Brazil, and the United States) until he resigned as Ambassador to Washington in 1950 following the assassination of Carlos Delgado Chalbaud.

He was a contributor to El Heraldo de Cuba, amongst other publications.

Books
Novels
 Política feminista: o, El doctor Bebé (1910)
 Vidas oscuras (1912)
 Tierra del sol amada (1917)
 La casa de los Ábila (1946)

Other
 Memorias de un venezolano de la decadencia (1927, historical)
 Cuentos grotescos (1922, short stories)

Books by others
 Cartas a José Rafael Pocaterra (1889–1955) (2007, collection of letters to Pocaterra). Editorial El Perro y la Rana. 
 José Rafael Pocaterra (1889–1955) (2009, by Simón Alberto Consalvi). Editora El Nacional.

References

Venezuelan novelists
Venezuelan male writers
Male novelists
1955 deaths
1889 births
Ambassadors of Venezuela to the United Kingdom
Ambassadors of Venezuela to the United States
Ambassadors of Venezuela to the Soviet Union
Ambassadors of Venezuela to Brazil
People from Valencia, Venezuela
20th-century novelists
20th-century male writers
Prisoners and detainees of Venezuela
Venezuelan torture victims
Communications ministers of Venezuela
Labour ministers of Venezuela